Pseudochazara daghestana is a species of butterfly in the family Nymphalidae. It is confined to the Caucasus and Transcaucasia to northern Iran.

Flight period 
The species is univoltine and is on wing from July to September.

Food plants
Larvae feed on grasses.

Subspecies
Pseudochazara daghestana daghestana
Pseudochazara daghestana savalanica Gross & Ebert, 1975 (Caucasus Minor, Armenian Highland)

References

 Satyrinae of the Western Palearctic - Pseudochazara daghestana

Pseudochazara
Butterflies described in 1955